("German School of Genoa") is a German international school in Genoa, Italy. The school serves kindergarten through gymnasium.

See also
German international schools in Italy:
 Deutsche Schule Mailand
 Deutsche Schule Rom
Italian international schools in Germany:
 Liceo Italo Svevo
 Papst-Johannes XXIII-Schule

References

External links
  Deutsche Schule Genua
  Deutsche Schule Genua

Secondary schools in Italy
German international schools in Italy
Schools in Genoa